Žika Bujuklić (born 1952) is a Serbian academic and politician. He was elected to the National Assembly of Serbia in 2022 on the electoral list of the Serbian Progressive Party (Srpska napredna stranka, SNS).

Early life and academic career
Bujuklić was born in Belgrade, in what was then the People's Republic of Serbia in the Federal People's Republic of Yugoslavia. After graduating from the violin department of the Stanković Musical School, he attended the University of Belgrade Faculty of Law, earning a bachelor's degree in 1975. In 1985, he received a master's degree for his thesis on property law in the medieval Statute of Budva. 

He was approved for a doctoral dissertation on hereditary law in fourteenth-century Kotor but was required to change his thesis due to the Yugoslav Wars of the 1990s and the unavailability of some Montenegrin archives; he instead received a Ph.D in the field of Roman law in 1999. He has published widely on the subject; his book Forum Romanum: Roman State, Law, Religion, and Myth received the Veselin Lučić Endowment Award for best scientific achievement by a University of Belgrade professor in 2005.

Bujuklić became an assistant trainee at the University of Belgrade Faculty of Law in 1978, an assistant in 1985, an assistant professor in 1999, and a full professor in 2014. At one time, Aleksandar Vučić was one of his students. He retired in 2018.

Politician
For the 2022 Serbian parliamentary election, the Serbian Progressive Party chose to reserve the lead positions on its Together We Can Do Everything electoral list for non-party cultural figures and academics. Bujuklić was given the fifth position on the list. This was tantamount to election, and he was indeed elected when the list won a plurality victory with 120 out of 250 mandates.

He is a member of the assembly committee on education, science, technological development, and the information society; a member of the subcommittee on science and higher education; a member of the committee on constitutional and legislative issues; a deputy member of the committee on Kosovo-Metohija; the head of Serbia's parliamentary friendship group with the Sovereign Order of Malta; and a member of the friendship group with Italy.

References

1952 births
Living people
Politicians from Belgrade
20th-century Serbian historians
21st-century Serbian historians
Members of the National Assembly (Serbia)